The 2022–23 Eastern Counties Football League, also known as the Thurlow Nunn League for sponsorship reasons, is the 80th season in the history of the Eastern Counties Football League, a football competition in England. Teams are divided into three divisions, the Premier Division at Step 5, and the geographically separated Division One North and Division One South (Eastern Senior League), both at Step 6 of the English football league system.

The allocations for Steps 5 and 6 this season were announced by the Football Association and published on the league's website on 13 May 2022, subject to appeals.

Premier Division
The Premier Division featured 20 clubs, of which 16 competed in the division last season.

To the Premier Division
Promoted from Division One North
Harleston Town
Sheringham

Promoted from Division One South
Ipswich Wanderers

Relegated from the Northern Premier League Division One Central
Soham Town Rangers

From the Premier Division
Promoted to the Isthmian League North
Gorleston
Wroxham

Relegated to Division One North
Swaffham Town

Transferred to the United Counties League Premier South
March Town United

Premier Division table
Prior to the first match(es) being played the Pos column shows alphabetic sequence of teams rather than league position.

Division One North
Division One North comprises 19 teams, three more than the previous season.

To Division One North
Promoted from the Anglian Combination
Heacham

Relegated from the Premier Division
Swaffham Town

Relegated from the United Counties League Premier South
Holbeach United

Transferred from Division One South
AFC Sudbury Reserves
Cornard United
Harwich & Parkeston
Haverhill Borough
Holland

From Division One North
Promoted to the Premier Division
Harleston Town
Sheringham

Relegated to the Peterborough and District League
Peterborough North End Sports, resigned from the league
Wisbech St Mary

Withdrew
University of East Anglia

Division One North table
Prior to the first match(es) being played the Pos column shows alphabetic sequence of teams rather than league position.

Division One South (Eastern Senior League)
Division One South comprises 19 teams, one fewer than the previous season.

To Division One South
Promoted from the Essex and Suffolk Border League
Stanway Pegasus

Promoted from the Essex Alliance League
Cannons Wood, formerly DTFC

Promoted from the Essex Olympian League
Basildon Town

Promoted from the Middlesex County League
NW London

Relegated from the Essex Senior League
Sporting Bengal United
St Margaretsbury

Relegated from the Southern Counties East League
Tower Hamlets

Transferred from the Combined Counties League Division One
Enfield Borough

From Division One South
Promoted to the Essex Senior League
Buckhurst Hill
Halstead Town

Promoted to the Premier Division
Ipswich Wanderers

Relegated to the Spartan South Midlands League Division Two
Brimsdown

Transferred to Division One North
AFC Sudbury Reserves
Cornard United
Harwich & Parkeston
Haverhill Borough
Holland

Division One South table
Prior to the first match(es) being played the Pos column shows alphabetic sequence of teams rather than league position.

References

Eastern Counties Football League seasons
9